Cecilia Calderón Prieto (b. 5 December 1949) is an Ecuadorian economist and former politician representing Guayas Province belonging to the Alfarista Radical Front (FRA).

Early life
Cecilia Calderón was born in Guayaquil on 5 December 1949, the daughter of Abdon Calderon Muñoz and Rosita Prieto. Even in her youth, Calderón leaned towards politics, actively volunteering for the presidential campaign of Andrés Córdova, the Liberal candidate for the 1968 Ecuadorian general election. She attended and graduated from the Catholic University of Guayaquil as an economist.

Leadership of the FRA
Shortly after the first round of the election, Calderon Muñoz was murdered on the orders of the military dictatorship on 29 November 1978, leaving Calderón as leader of the party, making Calderon the first woman in Ecuador to assume leadership of a political party. Calderón fought for justice for her father, which was granted when President Jaime Roldós Aguilera declared former government minister Bolívar Jarrín Cahueñas guilty of the murder, marking the first time in Ecuador's history that a political crime had been sanctioned by a government of Ecuador.

In the provincial elections for Guayas Province of 1980, Calderón was elected the first female member of the Provincial Council and because of the high number of votes for her, she won the Vice President's seat in the Council. Calderón was then in 1986 elected to the National Congress of Ecuador, becoming the only woman to sit on that congress. She faced some discomfort on account of her gender, such as the lack of a female bathroom that led her to ask the President of the Congress for a key to a private bathroom. In 1991, she accrued much criticism for criticizing the high budget of the Ecuadorian Armed Forces.

Citations

References
Books

 
 

1949 births
Living people
20th-century Ecuadorian economists
20th-century Ecuadorian women politicians
20th-century Ecuadorian politicians
21st-century Ecuadorian women politicians
21st-century Ecuadorian politicians
People from Guayaquil
Universidad Católica de Santiago de Guayaquil alumni
Alfarista Radical Front politicians
Ecuadorian women economists